Brachylomia curvifascia is a moth of the family Noctuidae first described by Smith in 1891. It is found in western North America from British Columbia south to California.

Adults are on wing from August to September in California.

References 

Brachylomia
Moths described in 1891